Selena O'Hanlon (born March 21, 1981) is a Canadian equestrian who competes in the sport of eventing.

Olympics
O'Hanlon competed at the 2008 Summer Olympics in Beijing, finishing 45th in the individual event and 9th in the team event.

In July 2016, she was named to Canada's Olympic team. However on July 29 she was withdrawn from her team due to an injury to her horse Foxwood High.

References

External links
Official website

1981 births
Living people
Equestrians at the 2008 Summer Olympics
Olympic equestrians of Canada
Canadian female equestrians
Pan American Games medalists in equestrian
Pan American Games silver medalists for Canada
Equestrians at the 2011 Pan American Games
Medalists at the 2011 Pan American Games